The shooting competition at the 2010 Central American and Caribbean Games was held in Mayagüez, Puerto Rico.

The tournament was scheduled to be held from 18–25 July at the Albergue Olimpico in Salinas.

Medal summary

Men's events

Women's events

External links

Events at the 2010 Central American and Caribbean Games
Central American and Caribbean Games
2010